The First Baptist Church is a historic church building, now housing the non-denominational Dominion Outreach Worship Center, at 119 29th Street in Newport News, Virginia.  Built in 1902, the church is a prominent local example of Romanesque Revival architecture executed in stone. It was designed by R.H. Hunt of Chattanooga. It is fronted by a three-arch recessed porch, flanked by a tower on the left whose upper stages have rounded corners, and is capped by a pyramidal roof with conical turrets at the corners.  The congregation was organized in the 1880s, and occupied this site until the 1980s. The congregation opened a suburban chapel in 1979. It operated on both sites for many years before closing the 29th Street church.

The building, and the attached education building, were listed on the National Register of Historic Places in 2000. Since First Baptist left the building has been owned and occupied by a number of churches. In 2000 it was owned by Rehoboth Fellowship Church, later it was occupied by Calvary Revival Church Peninsula, and in 2022 by Dominion Outreach Worship Center.

See also
National Register of Historic Places listings in Newport News, Virginia

References

External links

Buildings and structures in Newport News, Virginia
National Register of Historic Places in Newport News, Virginia
Churches on the National Register of Historic Places in Virginia